Louis Desmet (born 5 January 1930) is a Belgian middle-distance runner. He competed in the men's 800 metres at the 1952 Summer Olympics.

References

1930 births
Living people
Athletes (track and field) at the 1952 Summer Olympics
Belgian male middle-distance runners
Olympic athletes of Belgium
Place of birth missing (living people)